In linear algebra, a rotation matrix is a transformation matrix that is used to perform a rotation in Euclidean space. For example, using the convention below, the matrix

rotates points in the  plane counterclockwise through an angle  with respect to the positive  axis about the origin of a two-dimensional Cartesian coordinate system. To perform the rotation on a plane point with standard coordinates , it should be written as a column vector, and multiplied by the matrix :

Indeed, a rotation matrix can be seen as the trigonometric summation angle formulae in matrix form. One way to understand this is say we have a vector at an angle 30° from the  axis, and we wish to rotate that angle by a further 45°. We simply need to compute the vector endpoint coordinates at 75°.

The examples in this article apply to active rotations of vectors counterclockwise in a right-handed coordinate system ( counterclockwise from ) by pre-multiplication ( on the left).  If any one of these is changed (such as rotating axes instead of vectors, a passive transformation), then the inverse of the example matrix should be used, which coincides with its transpose.

Since matrix multiplication has no effect on the zero vector (the coordinates of the origin), rotation matrices describe rotations about the origin. Rotation matrices provide an algebraic description of such rotations, and are used extensively for computations in geometry, physics, and computer graphics. In some literature, the term rotation is generalized to include improper rotations, characterized by orthogonal matrices with a determinant of −1 (instead of +1). These combine proper rotations with reflections (which invert orientation). In other cases, where reflections are not being considered, the label proper may be dropped. The latter convention is followed in this article.

Rotation matrices are square matrices, with real entries. The set of all orthogonal matrices of size   with determinant +1 is a representation of a group known as the special orthogonal group , one example of which is the rotation group SO(3). The set of all orthogonal matrices of size  with determinant +1 or −1 is a representation of the (general) orthogonal group .

In two dimensions

In two dimensions, the standard rotation matrix has the following form:

This rotates column vectors by means of the following matrix multiplication,

Thus, the new coordinates  of a point  after rotation are

Examples 
For example, when the vector

is rotated by an angle , its new coordinates are

and when the vector

is rotated by an angle , its new coordinates are

Direction 
The direction of vector rotation is counterclockwise if  is positive (e.g. 90°), and clockwise if  is negative (e.g. −90°). Thus the clockwise rotation matrix is found as

The two-dimensional case is the only non-trivial (i.e. not one-dimensional) case where the rotation matrices group is commutative, so that it does not matter in which order multiple rotations are performed.  An alternative convention uses rotating axes, and the above matrices also represent a rotation of the axes clockwise through an angle .

Non-standard orientation of the coordinate system

If a left-handed Cartesian coordinate system is used, with   directed to the right but  directed down,  is clockwise. Such non-standard orientations are rarely used in mathematics but are common in 2D computer graphics, which often have the origin in the top left corner and the  down the screen or page.

See below for other alternative conventions which may change the sense of the rotation produced by a rotation matrix.

Common rotations
Particularly useful are the matrices

for 90°, 180°, and 270° counter-clockwise rotations.

Relationship with complex plane
Since

the matrices of the shape

form a ring isomorphic to the field of the complex numbers . Under this isomorphism, the rotation matrices correspond to circle of the unit complex numbers, the complex numbers of modulus .

If one identifies  with  through the linear isomorphism  the action of a matrix of the above form on vectors of  corresponds to the multiplication by the complex number , and rotations correspond to multiplication by complex numbers of modulus .

As every rotation matrix can be written

the above correspondence associates such a matrix with the complex number

(this last equality is Euler's formula).

In three dimensions

Basic rotations

A basic rotation (also called elemental rotation) is a rotation about one of the axes of a coordinate system. The following three basic rotation matrices rotate vectors by an angle  about the -, -, or -axis, in three dimensions, using the right-hand rule—which codifies their alternating signs. Notice that the right-hand rule only works when multiplying . (The same matrices can also represent a clockwise rotation of the axes.)

For column vectors, each of these basic vector rotations appears counterclockwise when the axis about which they occur points toward the observer, the coordinate system is right-handed, and the angle  is positive.

This is similar to the rotation produced by the above-mentioned two-dimensional rotation matrix. See below for alternative conventions which may apparently or actually invert the sense of the rotation produced by these matrices.

General rotations

Other rotation matrices can be obtained from these three using matrix multiplication.  For example, the product

Similarly, the product

These matrices produce the desired effect only if they are used to premultiply column vectors, and (since in general matrix multiplication is not commutative) only if they are applied in the specified order (see Ambiguities for more details). The order of rotation operations is from right to left; the matrix adjacent to the column vector is the first to be applied, and then the one to the left.

Conversion from rotation matrix to axis–angle 
Every rotation in three dimensions is defined by its axis (a vector along this axis is unchanged by the rotation), and its angle — the amount of rotation about that axis (Euler rotation theorem).

There are several methods to compute the axis and angle from a rotation matrix (see also axis–angle representation). Here, we only describe the method based on the computation of the eigenvectors and eigenvalues of the rotation matrix. It is also possible to use the trace of the rotation matrix.

Determining the axis

Given a  rotation matrix , a vector  parallel to the rotation axis must satisfy

Further, the equation may be rewritten

Viewed in another way,  is an eigenvector of  corresponding to the eigenvalue . Every rotation matrix must have this eigenvalue, the other two eigenvalues being complex conjugates of each other. It follows that a general rotation matrix in three dimensions has, up to a multiplicative constant, only one real eigenvector.

One way to determine the rotation axis is by showing that:

Since  is a skew-symmetric matrix, we can choose  such that

The matrix–vector product becomes a cross product of a vector with itself, ensuring that the result is zero:

Therefore, if

then

This does not work if  is symmetric.  Above, if  is zero, then all subsequent steps are invalid.  In this case, it is necessary to diagonalize  and find the eigenvector corresponding to an eigenvalue of 1.

Determining the angle
To find the angle of a rotation, once the axis of the rotation is known, select a vector  perpendicular to the axis.

A more direct method, however, is to simply calculate the trace: the sum of the diagonal elements of the rotation matrix. Care should be taken to select the right sign for the angle  to match the chosen axis:

from which follows that the angle's absolute value is

Rotation matrix from axis and angle

A derivation of this matrix from first principles can be found in section 9.2 here. The basic idea to derive this matrix is dividing the problem into few known simple steps.

 First rotate the given axis and the point such that the axis lies in one of the coordinate planes (or )
 Then rotate the given axis and the point such that the axis is aligned with one of the two coordinate axes for that particular coordinate plane (or )
 Use one of the fundamental rotation matrices to rotate the point depending on the coordinate axis with which the rotation axis is aligned.
 Reverse rotate the axis-point pair such that it attains the final configuration as that was in step 2 (Undoing step 2)
 Reverse rotate the axis-point pair which was done in step 1 (undoing step 1)

This can be written more concisely as 

Alternatively, the matrix entries are:

This is a matrix form of Rodrigues' rotation formula, (or the equivalent, differently parametrized Euler–Rodrigues formula) with

In  the rotation of a vector  around the axis  by an angle  can be written as:

Explicitly, with  a right-handed orthonormal basis,

Note the striking merely apparent differences to the equivalent Lie-algebraic formulation below.

Properties 
For any -dimensional rotation matrix  acting on 
  (The rotation is an orthogonal matrix)
It follows that:
 

A rotation is termed proper if , and improper (or a roto-reflection) if . Therefore, there may be no vectors fixed by the rotation, and thus no axis of rotation. Any fixed eigenvectors occur in pairs, and the axis of rotation is an even-dimensional subspace.

For odd dimensions , a proper rotation  will have an odd number of eigenvalues, with at least one  and the axis of rotation will be an odd dimensional subspace. Proof:

Here  is the identity matrix, and we use , as well as  since  is odd.

In 3-space , the axis of a non-null proper rotation is always a unique line, and a rotation around this axis by angle  has eigenvalues . In 4-space , the four eigenvalues are of the form . The null rotation has . Otherwise, there is no axis plane.

The trace of a rotation matrix is equal to the sum of its eigenvalues. For , a rotation by angle  has trace . For , a rotation around any axis by angle  has trace .

Examples 

The  rotation matrix

corresponds to a 90° planar rotation clockwise about the origin.

The transpose of the  matrix

is its inverse, but since its determinant is −1, this is not a proper rotation matrix; it is a reflection across the line .

The  rotation matrix

corresponds to a −30° rotation around the -axis in three-dimensional space.

The  rotation matrix

corresponds to a rotation of approximately −74° around the axis  in three-dimensional space.

The  permutation matrix

is a rotation matrix, as is the matrix of any even permutation, and rotates through 120° about the axis .

The  matrix

has determinant +1, but is not orthogonal (its transpose is not its inverse), so it is not a rotation matrix.

The  matrix

is not square, and so cannot be a rotation matrix; yet  yields a  identity matrix (the columns are orthonormal).

The  matrix

describes an isoclinic rotation in four dimensions, a rotation through equal angles (180°) through two orthogonal planes.

The  rotation matrix

rotates vectors in the plane of the first two coordinate axes 90°, rotates vectors in the plane of the next two axes 180°, and leaves the last coordinate axis unmoved.

Geometry 
In Euclidean geometry, a rotation is an example of an isometry, a transformation that moves points without changing the distances between them. Rotations are distinguished from other isometries by two additional properties: they leave (at least) one point fixed, and they leave "handedness" unchanged. In contrast, a translation moves every point, a reflection exchanges left- and right-handed ordering, a glide reflection does both, and an improper rotation combines a change in handedness with a normal rotation.

If a fixed point is taken as the origin of a Cartesian coordinate system, then every point can be given coordinates as a displacement from the origin. Thus one may work with the vector space of displacements instead of the points themselves. Now suppose  are the coordinates of the vector  from the origin  to point .

which can be computed using the matrix multiplication

A geometric rotation transforms lines to lines, and preserves ratios of distances between points. From these properties it can be shown that a rotation is a linear transformation of the vectors, and thus can be written in matrix form, . The fact that a rotation preserves, not just ratios, but distances themselves, is stated as

or

Because this equation holds for all vectors, one concludes that every rotation matrix, satisfies the orthogonality condition,

Rotations preserve handedness because they cannot change the ordering of the axes, which implies the special matrix condition,

Equally important, it can be shown that any matrix satisfying these two conditions acts as a rotation.

Multiplication 
The inverse of a rotation matrix is its transpose, which is also a rotation matrix:

The product of two rotation matrices is a rotation matrix:

For , multiplication of  rotation matrices is generally not commutative.

This means that multiplication of rotation matrices corresponds to composition of rotations, applied in left-to-right order of their corresponding matrices.

Ambiguities 

The interpretation of a rotation matrix can be subject to many ambiguities.

In most cases the effect of the ambiguity is equivalent to the effect of a rotation matrix inversion (for these orthogonal matrices equivalently matrix transpose).

 Alias or alibi (passive or active) transformation
 The coordinates of a point  may change due to either a rotation of the coordinate system  (alias), or a rotation of the point  (alibi). In the latter case, the rotation of  also produces a rotation of the vector  representing . Any given rotation can be legitimately described both ways, as vectors and coordinate systems actually rotate with respect to each other, about the same axis but in opposite directions. Throughout this article, we chose the alibi approach to describe rotations. For instance, 

Alibi and alias transformations are also known as active and passive transformations, respectively.
 Pre-multiplication or post-multiplication
 The same point  can be represented either by a column vector  or a row vector . Rotation matrices can either pre-multiply column vectors, or post-multiply row vectors. Throughout this article, rotations produced on column vectors are described by means of a pre-multiplication.
 Right- or left-handed coordinates
 The matrix and the vector can be represented with respect to a right-handed or left-handed coordinate system. Throughout the article, we assumed a right-handed orientation, unless otherwise specified.
 Vectors or forms
 The vector space has a dual space of linear forms, and the matrix can act on either vectors or forms.

Decompositions

Independent planes 
Consider the  rotation matrix

If  acts in a certain direction, purely as a scaling by a factor , then we have

so that

Two features are noteworthy. First, one of the roots (or eigenvalues) is 1, which tells us that some direction is unaffected by the matrix. For rotations in three dimensions, this is the axis of the rotation (a concept that has no meaning in any other dimension). This factorization is of interest for  rotation matrices because the same thing occurs for all of them. (As special cases, for a null rotation the "complex conjugates" are both 1, and for a 180° rotation they are both −1.) Furthermore, a similar factorization holds for any  rotation matrix. If the dimension, is odd, there will be a "dangling" eigenvalue of 1; and for any dimension the rest of the polynomial factors into quadratic terms like the one here (with the two special cases noted). We are guaranteed that the characteristic polynomial will have degree  and thus  eigenvalues. And since a rotation matrix commutes with its transpose, it is a normal matrix, so can be diagonalized. We conclude that every rotation matrix, when expressed in a suitable coordinate system, partitions into independent rotations of two-dimensional subspaces, at most  of them.

The sum of the entries on the main diagonal of a matrix is called the trace; it does not change if we reorient the coordinate system, and always equals the sum of the eigenvalues. In the three-dimensional case, the subspace consists of all vectors perpendicular to the rotation axis (the invariant direction, with eigenvalue 1). Thus we can extract from any  rotation matrix a rotation axis and an angle, and these completely determine the rotation.

Sequential angles 
The constraints on a  rotation matrix imply that it must have the form

To solve for  it is not enough to look at  alone or  alone; we must consider both together to place the angle in the correct quadrant, using a two-argument arctangent function.

Now consider the first column of a  rotation matrix,

Although  will probably not equal 1, but some value , we can use a slight variation of the previous computation to find a so-called Givens rotation that transforms the column to

zeroing . This acts on the subspace spanned by the - and -axes. We can then repeat the process for the -subspace to zero . Acting on the full matrix, these two rotations produce the schematic form

Shifting attention to the second column, a Givens rotation of the -subspace can now zero the  value. This brings the full matrix to the form

which is an identity matrix. Thus we have decomposed  as

An  rotation matrix will have , or

entries below the diagonal to zero. We can zero them by extending the same idea of stepping through the columns with a series of rotations in a fixed sequence of planes. We conclude that the set of  rotation matrices, each of which has  entries, can be parameterized by  angles.

In three dimensions this restates in matrix form an observation made by Euler, so mathematicians call the ordered sequence of three angles Euler angles. However, the situation is somewhat more complicated than we have so far indicated. Despite the small dimension, we actually have considerable freedom in the sequence of axis pairs we use; and we also have some freedom in the choice of angles. Thus we find many different conventions employed when three-dimensional rotations are parameterized for physics, or medicine, or chemistry, or other disciplines. When we include the option of world axes or body axes, 24 different sequences are possible. And while some disciplines call any sequence Euler angles, others give different names (Cardano, Tait–Bryan, roll-pitch-yaw) to different sequences.

One reason for the large number of options is that, as noted previously, rotations in three dimensions (and higher) do not commute. If we reverse a given sequence of rotations, we get a different outcome. This also implies that we cannot compose two rotations by adding their corresponding angles. Thus Euler angles are not vectors, despite a similarity in appearance as a triplet of numbers.

Nested dimensions 
A  rotation matrix such as

suggests a  rotation matrix,

is embedded in the upper left corner:

This is no illusion; not just one, but many, copies of -dimensional rotations are found within -dimensional rotations, as subgroups. Each embedding leaves one direction fixed, which in the case of  matrices is the rotation axis. For example, we have

fixing the -axis, the -axis, and the -axis, respectively. The rotation axis need not be a coordinate axis; if  is a unit vector in the desired direction, then

A direction in -dimensional space will be a unit magnitude vector, which we may consider a point on a generalized sphere, . A suitable formalism is the fiber bundle,

where for every direction in the base space, the fiber over it in the total space, is a copy of the fiber space, namely the rotations that keep that direction fixed.

A point on  can be selected using  numbers, so we again have  numbers to describe any  rotation matrix.

In fact, we can view the sequential angle decomposition, discussed previously, as reversing this process.

Skew parameters via Cayley's formula 

When an  rotation matrix , does not include a −1 eigenvalue, thus none of the planar rotations which it comprises are 180° rotations, then  is an invertible matrix. Most rotation matrices fit this description, and for them it can be shown that  is a skew-symmetric matrix, . Thus ; and since the diagonal is necessarily zero, and since the upper triangle determines the lower one,  contains  independent numbers.

Conveniently,  is invertible whenever  is skew-symmetric; thus we can recover the original matrix using the Cayley transform,

which maps any skew-symmetric matrix  to a rotation matrix. In fact, aside from the noted exceptions, we can produce any rotation matrix in this way. Although in practical applications we can hardly afford to ignore 180° rotations, the Cayley transform is still a potentially useful tool, giving a parameterization of most rotation matrices without trigonometric functions.

In three dimensions, for example, we have 

If we condense the skew entries into a vector, then we produce a 90° rotation around the -axis for (1, 0, 0), around the -axis for (0, 1, 0), and around the -axis for (0, 0, 1).

Decomposition into shears 

For the 2D case, a rotation matrix can be decomposed into three shear matrices:

This is useful, for instance, in computer graphics, since shears can be implemented with fewer multiplication instructions than rotating a bitmap directly. On modern computers, this may not matter, but it can be relevant for very old or low-end microprocessors.

A rotation can also be written as two shears and scaling:

Group theory 
Below follow some basic facts about the role of the collection of all rotation matrices of a fixed dimension (here mostly 3) in mathematics and particularly in physics where rotational symmetry is a requirement of every truly fundamental law (due to the assumption of isotropy of space), and where the same symmetry, when present, is a simplifying property of many problems of less fundamental nature. Examples abound in classical mechanics and quantum mechanics. Knowledge of the part of the solutions pertaining to this symmetry applies (with qualifications) to all such problems and it can be factored out of a specific problem at hand, thus reducing its complexity. A prime example – in mathematics and physics – would be the theory of spherical harmonics. Their role in the group theory of the rotation groups is that of being a representation space for the entire set of finite-dimensional irreducible representations of the rotation group SO(3). For this topic, see Rotation group SO(3) § Spherical harmonics.

The main articles listed in each subsection are referred to for more detail.

Lie group 

The  rotation matrices for each  form a group, the special orthogonal group, . Thus  is for each  a Lie group. It is compact and connected, but not simply connected. It is also a semi-simple group, in fact a simple group with the exception SO(4). The relevance of this is that all theorems and all machinery from the theory of analytic manifolds (analytic manifolds are in particular smooth manifolds) apply and the well-developed representation theory of compact semi-simple groups is ready for use.

Lie algebra 

Exponential map 

Connecting the Lie algebra to the Lie group is the exponential map, which is defined using the standard matrix exponential  series for  For any skew-symmetric matrix ,  is always a rotation matrix.

An important practical example is the  case. In rotation group SO(3), it is shown that one can identify every  with an Euler  vector , where  is a unit magnitude vector.

According to Rodrigues' rotation formula on matrix form, one obtains,

where
 

This is the matrix for a rotation around axis  by the angle . For full detail, see exponential map SO(3).

Baker–Campbell–Hausdorff formula 

This general expansion unfolds as

In the  case, the general infinite expansion has a compact form,

for suitable trigonometric function coefficients, detailed in the Baker–Campbell–Hausdorff formula for SO(3).

As a group identity, the above holds for all faithful representations, including the doublet (spinor representation), which is simpler. The same explicit formula thus follows straightforwardly through Pauli matrices; see the  derivation for SU(2). For the general  case, one might use Ref.

Spin group 

The Lie group of  rotation matrices, is not simply connected, so Lie theory tells us it is a homomorphic image of a universal covering group.

In the case of planar rotations, SO(2) is topologically a circle, . Its universal covering group, Spin(2), is isomorphic to the real line, under addition. Whenever angles of arbitrary magnitude are used one is taking advantage of the convenience of the universal cover. Every  rotation matrix is produced by a countable infinity of angles, separated by integer multiples of 2.

In the case of spatial rotations, SO(3) is topologically equivalent to three-dimensional real projective space, . Every  rotation matrix is produced by two opposite points on the sphere. Correspondingly, the fundamental group of SO(3) is isomorphic to the two-element group, .

We can also describe Spin(3) as isomorphic to quaternions of unit norm under multiplication, or to certain  real matrices, or to  complex special unitary matrices, namely SU(2). The covering maps for the first and the last case are given by

and

Many features of these cases are the same for higher dimensions. The natural setting for these groups is within a Clifford algebra. More importantly in applications to physics, the corresponding spin representation of the Lie algebra sits inside the Clifford algebra. It can be exponentiated in the usual way to give rise to a  representation, also known as projective representation of the rotation group. This is the case with SO(3) and SU(2), where the  representation can be viewed as an "inverse" of the covering map. By properties of covering maps, the inverse can be chosen ono-to-one as a local section, but not globally.

Infinitesimal rotations 

The matrices in the Lie algebra are not themselves rotations; the skew-symmetric matrices are derivatives, proportional differences of rotations. An actual "differential rotation", or infinitesimal rotation matrix has the form

The computation rules are as usual except that infinitesimals of second order are routinely dropped. With these rules, these matrices do not satisfy all the same properties as ordinary finite rotation matrices under the usual treatment of infinitesimals. It turns out that the order in which infinitesimal rotations are applied is irrelevant. To see this exemplified, consult infinitesimal rotations SO(3).

Conversions 

We have seen the existence of several decompositions that apply in any dimension, namely independent planes, sequential angles, and nested dimensions. In all these cases we can either decompose a matrix or construct one. We have also given special attention to  rotation matrices, and these warrant further attention, in both directions .

Quaternion 

Given the unit quaternion , the equivalent pre-multiplied (to be used with column vectors)  rotation matrix is 

Now every quaternion component appears multiplied by two in a term of degree two, and if all such terms are zero what is left is an identity matrix. This leads to an efficient, robust conversion from any quaternion – whether unit or non-unit – to a  rotation matrix. Given:

we can calculate

 
Freed from the demand for a unit quaternion, we find that nonzero quaternions act as homogeneous coordinates for  rotation matrices. The Cayley transform, discussed earlier, is obtained by scaling the quaternion so that its  component is 1. For a 180° rotation around any axis,  will be zero, which explains the Cayley limitation.

So we can easily compare the magnitudes of all four quaternion components using the matrix diagonal. We can, in fact, obtain all four magnitudes using sums and square roots, and choose consistent signs using the skew-symmetric part of the off-diagonal entries:

Alternatively, use a single square root and division

This is numerically stable so long as the trace, is not negative; otherwise, we risk dividing by (nearly) zero. In that case, suppose  is the largest diagonal entry, so  will have the largest magnitude (the other cases are derived by cyclic permutation); then the following is safe.

If the matrix contains significant error, such as accumulated numerical error, we may construct a symmetric  matrix,

and find the eigenvector, of its largest magnitude eigenvalue. (If  is truly a rotation matrix, that value will be 1.) The quaternion so obtained will correspond to the rotation matrix closest to the given matrix  (Note: formulation of the cited article is post-multiplied, works with row vectors).

Polar decomposition 
If the  matrix  is nonsingular, its columns are linearly independent vectors; thus the Gram–Schmidt process can adjust them to be an orthonormal basis. Stated in terms of numerical linear algebra, we convert  to an orthogonal matrix, using QR decomposition. For that, the tool we want is the polar decomposition.

To measure closeness, we may use any matrix norm invariant under orthogonal transformations. A convenient choice is the Frobenius norm, squared, which is the sum of the squares of the element differences. Writing this in terms of the trace, our goal is,

Though written in matrix terms, the objective function is just a quadratic polynomial. We can minimize it in the usual way, by finding where its derivative is zero. For a  matrix, the orthogonality constraint implies six scalar equalities that the entries of  must satisfy. To incorporate the constraint(s), we may employ a standard technique, Lagrange multipliers, assembled as a symmetric matrix, . Thus our method is:
 Differentiate  with respect to (the entries of) , and equate to zero.

Consider a  example. Including constraints, we seek to minimize

In general, we obtain the equation

so that

To ensure a minimum, the  matrix (and hence ) must be positive definite.

That is,  is only guaranteed to be orthogonal, not a rotation matrix.

Axis and angle 

To efficiently construct a rotation matrix  from an angle  and a unit axis , we can take advantage of symmetry and skew-symmetry within the entries.

then

Additionally, axis–angle extraction presents additional difficulties. The angle can be restricted to be from 0° to 180°, but angles are formally ambiguous by multiples of 360°. When the angle is zero, the axis is undefined. When the angle is 180°, the matrix becomes symmetric, which has implications in extracting the axis. Near multiples of 180°, care is needed to avoid numerical problems: in extracting the angle, a two-argument arctangent with  equal to  avoids the insensitivity of arccos; and in computing the axis magnitude in order to force unit magnitude, a brute-force approach can lose accuracy through underflow .

A partial approach is as follows:

A fully robust approach will use a different algorithm when , the trace of the matrix , is negative, as with quaternion extraction. When  is zero because the angle is zero, an axis must be provided from some source other than the matrix.

Euler angles 
Complexity of conversion escalates with Euler angles (used here in the broad sense). The first difficulty is to establish which of the twenty-four variations of Cartesian axis order we will use.

while aircraft dynamics may use

One systematic approach begins with choosing the rightmost axis. Choosing parity thus establishes the middle axis. That leaves two choices for the left-most axis, either duplicating the first or not. These three choices gives us  variations; we double that to 24 by choosing static or rotating axes.

This is enough to construct a matrix from angles, but triples differing in many ways can give the same rotation matrix. For example, suppose we use the  convention above; then we have the following equivalent pairs:
{| style="text-align:right"
| (90°,||45°,||−105°) || ≡ || (−270°,||−315°,||255°) || multiples of 360°
|-
| (72°,||0°,||0°) || ≡ || (40°,||0°,||32°) || singular alignment
|-
| (45°,||60°,||−30°) || ≡ || (−135°,||−60°,||150°) || bistable flip
|}
Angles for any order can be found using a concise common routine.

The problem of singular alignment, the mathematical analog of physical gimbal lock, occurs when the middle rotation aligns the axes of the first and last rotations. It afflicts every axis order at either even or odd multiples of 90°. These singularities are not characteristic of the rotation matrix as such, and only occur with the usage of Euler angles.

The singularities are avoided when considering and manipulating the rotation matrix as orthonormal row vectors (in 3D applications often named the right-vector, up-vector and out-vector) instead of as angles. The singularities are also avoided when working with quaternions.

Vector to vector formulation 
In some instances it is interesting to describe a rotation by specifying how a vector is mapped into another through the shortest path (smallest angle). In  this completely describes the associated rotation matrix. In general, given , the matrix

Uniform random rotation matrices 
We sometimes need to generate a uniformly distributed random rotation matrix. It seems intuitively clear in two dimensions that this means the rotation angle is uniformly distributed between 0 and 2. That intuition is correct, but does not carry over to higher dimensions.

Since  is a connected and locally compact Lie group, we have a simple standard criterion for uniformity, namely that the distribution be unchanged when composed with any arbitrary rotation (a Lie group "translation"). This definition corresponds to what is called Haar measure.  show how to use the Cayley transform to generate and test matrices according to this criterion.

Generate a uniform angle and construct a  rotation matrix.

As usual, we have special alternatives for the  case. Each of these methods begins with three independent random scalars uniformly distributed on the unit interval.  takes advantage of the odd dimension to change a Householder reflection to a rotation by negation, and uses that to aim the axis of a  uniform planar rotation.

Another method uses unit quaternions. Multiplication of rotation matrices is homomorphic to multiplication of quaternions, and multiplication by a unit quaternion rotates the unit sphere. In practice: create a four-element vector where each element is a sampling of a normal distribution. Normalize its length and you have a uniformly sampled random unit quaternion which represents a uniformly sampled random rotation. Note that the aforementioned only applies to rotations in dimension 3. For a generalised idea of quaternions, one should look into Rotors.

Euler angles can also be used, though not with each angle uniformly distributed.

For the axis–angle form, the axis is uniformly distributed over the unit sphere of directions, while the angle has the nonuniform distribution over  noted previously .

See also

 Euler–Rodrigues formula
 Euler's rotation theorem
 Rodrigues' rotation formula
 Plane of rotation
 Axis–angle representation
 Rotation group SO(3)
 Rotation formalisms in three dimensions
 Rotation operator (vector space)
 Transformation matrix
 Yaw-pitch-roll system
 Kabsch algorithm
 Isometry
 Rigid transformation
 Rotations in 4-dimensional Euclidean space
 Trigonometric Identities
 Versor

Remarks

Notes

References 
 
 
 
 
 ; reprinted as article 52 in 
 
 
 
 
 
  (GTM 222)
 
 
 
 
 
 
 

 

 
 
  (Also NASA-CR-53568.)
  (GTM 102)

External links
 
 Rotation matrices at Mathworld
 Math Awareness Month 2000 interactive demo (requires Java)
 Rotation Matrices at MathPages
  A parametrization of SOn(R) by generalized Euler Angles
 Rotation about any point

Transformation (function)
Matrices
Mathematical physics